The Holland–Bukit Panjang Group Representation Constituency was a Group Representation Constituency (GRC) in Singapore which only appeared in the 2001 elections. Prior to that, parts of the Cashew and Zhenghua were originally Bukit Panjang division of the Sembawang GRC and several parts of Bukit Timah (Eng Neo) were originally Tanglin division of the Kreta Ayer–Tanglin GRC. Buona Vista came from Tanjong Pagar GRC and Ulu Pandan came from Bukit Timah GRC.

Every division was absorbed into Holland–Bukit Timah GRC in 2006, except the Bukit Panjang division which was carved out as a Single Member Constituency (SMC).

Members of Parliament

Candidates and results

References

Singaporean electoral divisions
Bukit Panjang
Bukit Timah
Central Water Catchment
Mandai
Queenstown, Singapore